The Zagreb Soloists is a chamber orchestra founded in Zagreb, Croatia, in 1953 through the auspices of Zagreb Radiotelevision, under the artistic leadership of the Italian cellist and conductor, Antonio Janigro. After Janigro left the ensemble in 1968, the group was led first by their concertmaster, Dragutin Hrdjok, and then by their longtime artistic director and concertmaster, Tonko Ninić. In 1997, Anđelko Krpan became concertmaster, and in 2002, Karlo Slobodan Fio, took over as artistic director of the ensemble. Since 2006, the concertmaster and artistic leader has been Borivoj Martinic-Jercic.

The Zagreb Soloists have given over 3,500 concerts in all parts of the world, and are also very well known for their numerous recordings.

References

 Ansambl s najbogatijom povijesti

External links
 

Croatian orchestras
Chamber orchestras
Musical groups established in 1953
Croatian musical groups
Culture in Zagreb
1953 establishments in Croatia
Classical music in Croatia